Fires Under The Road is an album and a song from the Quebec hard rock group GrimSkunk released in 2006. The album marks the return of the classic GrimSkunk sound and is the first with new bass player Vince Peake, from the defunct band Groovy Aardvark.

Song List
Psychedelic Wonderdrug
America Sucks
Wakin' & Bakin'
Fires Under The Road
You Could Be Beautiful
VQL (Vive le Québec libre)
Divide And Conquer
Blown To Pieces
Out Of My Life
What Do You Say
We Are Lords
Power Corrupts
Worldly Grace
Parfait Perdant
Crazy

Personnel
Manu Eveno – guest artist, oud
Mike Fraser – mixing
Ben Kaplan – engineer
Howie Weinberg – mastering

References

2006 albums
GrimSkunk albums
Albums produced by Garth Richardson
Indica Records albums